Marek Galiński (13 May 1951 in Wrocław – 28 September 1999 in Wrocław) was a Polish wrestler who competed in the 1980 Summer Olympics.

References

External links
 

1951 births
1999 deaths
Olympic wrestlers of Poland
Wrestlers at the 1980 Summer Olympics
Polish male sport wrestlers
Sportspeople from Wrocław